The 2017–18 Edmonton Oilers season was the 39th season for the National Hockey League (NHL) franchise that was established on June 22, 1979, and 46th season including their play in the World Hockey Association (WHA). The Oilers missed the playoffs, despite qualifying for the playoffs the previous year and being given the second best preseason Stanley Cup odds.

Standings

Schedule and results

Pre-season
The Oilers released their pre-season schedule on June 8, 2017. The Oilers' rookies and prospects participated in the annual Young Stars Classic tournament before the start of pre-season games.

Regular season
The regular season schedule was published on June 22, 2017.

Player statistics
Final

Skaters

Goaltenders

†Denotes player spent time with another team before joining the Oilers. Statistics reflect time with the Oilers only.
‡Denotes player was traded mid-season. Statistics reflect time with the Oilers only.
Bold/italics denotes franchise record.

Milestones

Transactions
The Oilers have been involved in the following transactions during the 2017–18 season.

Trades

Free agents acquired

Free agents lost

Claimed via waivers

Lost via waivers

Players released

Lost via retirement

Player signings

Draft picks

Below are the Edmonton Oilers' selections at the 2017 NHL Entry Draft, which was held on June 23 and 24, 2017, at the United Center in Chicago, Illinois.

Draft notes:
 The Calgary Flames' third-round pick went to the Edmonton Oilers as the result of a trade on June 24, 2017 that sent St. Louis' Third Round Pick and Vancouver's fifth-round pick both in 2017 (82nd and 126th overall) to Arizona in exchange for this pick.

References

Edmonton Oilers seasons
Edmonton Oilers
Edmont